The grade of a crime is its ranking or classification by its degree or seriousness or severity. A felony is more serious than a misdemeanor, which is more serious than an infraction. A first degree felony is more serious than a second degree felony. The severity of punishment is based on the grade of the crime.

References

Crime